Oropeza is a province in the Chuquisaca Department, Bolivia. Its seat is Sucre which is also the constitutional capital of Bolivia and the capital of the Chuquisaca Department.

Geography 
Some of the highest mountains of the province are listed below:

Subdivision 
The province is divided into three municipalities which are further subdivided into cantons.

The people 
The people are predominantly indigenous citizens of Quechuan descent. 

Ref.: obd.descentralizacion.gov.bo

Languages 
The languages spoken in the province are mainly Spanish and Quechua.

Ref.: obd.descentralizacion.gov.bo

Places of interest 

The archaeological sites of Inka Mach'ay and Puma Mach'ay are situated within the province. Inka Mach'ay was declared a National Monument in 1958.

See also 
 Chullqi Mayu
 Inti Rumi
 Jatun Q'asa

References 

Provinces of Chuquisaca Department